Anthony Elliger (1701-1781) was an 18th-century painter from the Northern Netherlands.

Elliger was born in Amsterdam as the son of Ottomar Elliger II. He was the brother of Ottmar Elliger III. He married Christina Houbraken, a daughter of Arnold Houbraken and they became the father of Christina Maria Elliger.

Besides his daughter, his pupils were Jan Gerard Waldorp, Jurriaan Andriessen, Izaäk Schmidt, and Johannes Cornelis Mertens.

At the age of almost 80, Elliger died in Ede on the fifth of June.

References

1701 births
1781 deaths
Painters from Amsterdam
18th-century Dutch painters
18th-century Dutch male artists
Dutch male painters